Association Sportive CotonTchad is a football club from Chad based in N'Djamena.

History

ASCOT won national championship 2 times; in 1996 and 1998. The club also won national cup three times; in 1995, 1999 and 2009.

ASCOT represented Chad in CAF Confederation Cup 2 times; in 2007 and 2010. In 2008, ASCOT should have played Preliminary round of 2008 CAF Confederation Cup but was disqualified for failure to fulfill their financial obligations. In 2010, they were eliminated by Al Ahli (Tripoli) in Preliminary round.

Stadium

Stade Omnisports Idriss Mahamat Ouya, also named Stade Nacional, is a multi-purpose stadium located in N'Djamena, Chad. It is currently used mostly for football matches.  The stadium holds 20,000 people. It is currently the home ground of the Chad national football team. It is named after former Chadian highjumper Mahamat Idriss (1942—1987).

Achievements
Chad Premier League: 2
 1996, 1998.

Chad Cup: 3
 1995, 1999, 2009.

Coupe de Ligue de N'Djaména: 1
 2009.

Chad Super Cup: 0

Performance in CAF competitions
CAF Champions League: 2 appearances
1997 – First Round
1999 – Preliminary Round

CAF Confederation Cup: 3 appearances
2007 – First Round
2008 – disqualified in Preliminary Round
2010 – Preliminary Round

CAF Cup: 2 appearances
 1992 – First Round
 1998 – Quarter-Finals

CAF Cup Winners' Cup: 2 appearances
 1996 – First Round
 2000 – Preliminary Round

Current squad

Managers

 Modou Kouta
 2011 –? Oumar Francis
 2016 - Modou Kouta
 2018 - Mahamat Allamine 'Boli'

Presidents

 2012 - Adoum Faki

References

External links
Ligue match report

Football clubs in Chad
N'Djamena